Bonplandia is a genus of flowering plants belonging to the family Polemoniaceae.

Its native range is Mexico to Guatemala.

Species:

Bonplandia geminiflora 
Bonplandia linearis

References

Polemoniaceae
Polemoniaceae genera
Taxa named by Antonio José Cavanilles